Álvaro da Cunha (1371-?) was a Portuguese nobleman, 3rd Lord of Pombeiro.

Biography 

Álvaro was born in Portugal, was the son of João Lourenço da Cunha and Leonor Telles de Meneses. His wife was Beatriz Martins de Melo (descendant of Afonso Mendes de Melo).

References 

1371 births
1400s deaths
14th-century Portuguese people
15th-century Portuguese people
Portuguese nobility